Grillo is a white wine grape variety. 

Grillo may also refer to:

 Grillo (surname)
 Grillo telephone
 Grillo-Theater
 Cricket (insect) - The Italian and Spanish word indicating the cricket

See also 
 Il Grillo Parlante
 Il Marchese del Grillo
 El Grillo (disambiguation)